The Calingae or Calingi, according to ancient accounts, were a race of extremely short-lived people in India. According to Pliny the Elder they had a lifespan of only eight years. This has been viewed as exaggeration, akin to Pliny's report that the Mandi people of India bear children at age seven.

The Calingae were widely diffused over a large area according to Pliny, and consisted of the Calingae proper, the Gangarides-Calingae and the Macco-Calingae. This may have been a reference to the Tri-kalinga ("Three Kalingas") that appeared in the Puranas. The area of diffusion is thought to roughly coincide with the Northern Circars (now spanning the states of Andhra Pradesh and Odisha). Their chief cities were Dandagula (Dandaguda) and Parthalis (Protalis). According to political scientist Sudama Misra, the Kalinga janapada originally comprised the area covered by the Puri and Ganjam districts.

See also
 Buddhist eschatology, where a similar short-living race is mentioned.

Explanatory notes

References 
Citations

Bibliography

Medieval European legendary creatures